Rovdino is a rural locality (a selo) in Fedorogorskoye Rural Settlement of Shenkursky District, Arkhangelsk Oblast, Russia. The population was 976 as of 2010. There are 14 streets.

Geography 
Rovdino is located 61 km south of Shenkursk (the district's administrative centre) by road. Filippovskaya is the nearest rural locality.

References 

Rural localities in Shenkursky District